Sergei Ivanovich Osadchuk (born 18 October 1982) is a Russian professional football manager and a former player. He is the caretaker manager with FC Luki-Energiya Velikiye Luki.

Club career
He played two seasons in the Russian Football National League for FC Volga Nizhny Novgorod and FC Ufa.

References

1982 births
Living people
People from Aktau
Russian footballers
Association football midfielders
FC Lukhovitsy players
FC Ural Yekaterinburg players
FC Volga Nizhny Novgorod players
FC Chernomorets Novorossiysk players
FC Ufa players
FC Tekstilshchik Ivanovo players
Russian football managers
FC Volga Ulyanovsk players